Park Ridge is an active commuter railroad station in the borough of Park Ridge, Bergen County, New Jersey. Located at the intersection of Park and Hawthorne Avenues, the station services trains on the Pascack Valley Line, which runs from Hoboken Terminal to Spring Valley station in New York. The station contains a single low-level side platform split by Park Avenue (County Route 92) and a wooden station depot, built by the Hackensack and New York Extension Railroad. As a result, Park Ridge station is not handicap accessible under the Americans with Disabilities Act of 1990. 

Railroad service through Park Ridge began on May 27, 1871 with the final extension of the Hackensack and New York Extension Railroad from Hillsdale station in New Jersey to the junction with the Erie Railroad Piermont Branch at Nanuet. However, in order to establish a stop in Park Ridge, the railroad requested Washington Township residents fund the construction of a new depot.

History
The station house has been listed in the state and federal registers of historic places since 1984 and is part of the Operating Passenger Railroad Stations Thematic Resource.

Station layout
The station has one track and one low-level side platform.

Permit parking is operated by the Borough of Park Ridge. There are two permit parking lots available, with 100 and 34 parking spots, respectively.

See also 
 List of New Jersey Transit stations
 National Register of Historic Places listings in Bergen County, New Jersey

References

External links

Station and Station House from Park Avenue from Google Maps Street View

NJ Transit Rail Operations stations
Park Ridge, New Jersey
Railway stations on the National Register of Historic Places in New Jersey
Former Erie Railroad stations
Railway stations in the United States opened in 1871
Railway stations in Bergen County, New Jersey
National Register of Historic Places in Bergen County, New Jersey
New Jersey Register of Historic Places
1871 establishments in New Jersey